Carrington VC is a 1953 stage play by husband and wife playwrights Campbell and Dorothy Christie. The production premiered on the West End in London at the Westminster Theatre. It was directed by Michael MacOwan and starred Alec Clunes, John Wood, John Garside, Allan Cuthbertson, Lionel Jeffries, and Rachel Gurney. A resounding success, the play was adapted for film in 1954.

Original cast
Sergeant Crane - Stuart Saunders
Lieutenant-Colonel B.R. Reeve, M.C. - Philip Pearman
Bombardier Owen - Victor Maddern
Evans - Richard Davies
Cook - William Abney
Lieutenant-Colonel M.O. Henniker, O.B.E. - Allan Cuthbertson
Major H. Maunsell - Mark Dignam
Captain F.T. Foljambe - Robert Bishop
Captain C.O.P. Carrington, V.C., D.S.O. - Alec Clunes
Major J.P. Mitchell, M.C. - John Wood
A. Tester Terry - John Garside
Brigadier A.S. Meadmore, O.B.E. - Arnold Bell
Colonel T.B. Huxford, M.B.E. - Willoughby Gray
Major R.E. Panton, M.M. - Geoffrey Denys
Major A.T.M. Broke-Smith - Lionel Jeffreys
Captain A. Graham, W.R.A.C. - Jenny Laird
Valerie Carrington - Rachel Gurney

Adaptations
In 1954, the play was adapted for the screen by John Hunter, under the direction of Anthony Asquith and producer Teddy Baird. The film was released into theatres by Kingsley-International Pictures in 1955 and starred David Niven and Margaret Leighton.

In 1957, the play was adapted for radio and broadcast as part of the BBC's long-running Saturday Night Theatre series, with Howard Marion-Crawford as Major Carrington.

References

Sources
1950s British plays

1953 plays
Courts-martial in fiction
British plays adapted into films